The Paralympic Winter World Cup is a biannual international multi-sport event where athletes with a disability compete. The World Cup has been hosted in Sollefteå, Sweden since 2009. It is organized by the Swedish Paralympic Committee (SPC) in coordination with the International Paralympic Committee (IPC).

History
The Paralympic Winter World Cup replaced the Sollefteå Winter Games, that had taken place biannually since 1995.

Sports
Alpine skiing (2009–present)
Biathlon (2009–present)
Cross-country skiing (2009–present)
Ice sledge hockey (2009–present)

Editions

See also
Paralympic World Cup
Paralympic Games

References

External links
Official site

Recurring sporting events established in 2009
Parasports world championships
World Cup